The Battle of Hexham is a 1789 history play by the British writer George Colman the Younger. It is based around the 1464 Battle of Hexham, a decisive Yorkist victory during the War of the Roses. It revived Colman's career after the disappointment of his works following his earlier hit Inkle and Yarico. It premiered at the Haymarket Theatre in London on 11 August 1789 with a cast that included John Edwin and Maria Theresa Kemble. It helped reinvigorate the history genre. It combined a mixture of comedy, pathos and mystery and owned a great deal of it inspirator to Shakespeare's histories.

It appeared in Dublin at the Crow Street Theatre. It was revived again at the Haymarket on 12 June 1793 and the cast included William Barrymore as Gondibert, John Bannister as Gubbins, Richard Suett as Fool, Robert Baddeley as Corporal and Maria Theresa Kemble as Queen Margaret.

Bibliography
 Sutcliffe, Barry. Plays by George Colman the Younger and Thomas Morton. CUP Archive, 1983.
 Taylor, George. The French Revolution and the London Stage, 1789-1805 Cambridge University Press, 2000. 
 Watson, George. ''The New Cambridge Bibliography of English Literature: Volume 2, 1660–1800. Cambridge University Press, 1971.

References

Works by George Colman the Younger
1789 plays
West End plays
Historical plays
Plays set in the 15th century
British plays